Robert Dymkowski (born May 15, 1970) is a former Polish football player. He played for Pogoń Szczecin, PAOK Salonika, and Widzew Łódź. He ended his career in 2005.

Honours
Individual
I liga top scorer: 1990–91

References

1970 births
Living people
Polish footballers
Pogoń Szczecin players
Widzew Łódź players
Pogoń Szczecin managers
People from Koszalin
Sportspeople from West Pomeranian Voivodeship
Association footballers not categorized by position
Polish football managers